Gruppo Sportivo Libertas Trogylos Basket is an Italian women's basketball club from Priolo Gargallo. Founded in 1970, it reached the Serie A1 in 1986, where it played until its withdrawal in 2014.

Libertas Trogylos won the 1989 national championship and the 1990 European Cup, beating CSKA Moscow in the final. It also reached the 1992 Ronchetti Cup's final, lost to AS Vicenza. In 2000 the team won its second national title, marking its debut in the new Euroleague. Its best result since was a silver medal in 2006, while most recently it was 10th in the 2012 championship with a 5–17 record.

Titles
 European Cup
 1990
 Serie A
 1989, 2000

Players

2011-12 Roster
 (1.97)  Valentina Fabbri
 (1.93)  Jennifer Fleischer
 (1.91)  Katryna Gaither
 (1.88)  Michelle Maslowski
 (1.85)  Sivia Favento
 (1.82)  Tania Bertan
 (1.81)  Tanja Ćirov
 (1.81)  Tania Seino
 (1.80)  Roina Ciappina
 (1.78)  Susana Bonfiglio
 (1.77)  Elena Bestagno
 (1.74)  Elisa Buccianti
 (1.72)  Ilaria Milazzo

2013-14 Roster
 (2.02)  Aleksandra Delcheva

Notable former players
 Michaela Moua
 Florina Pașcalău
 Polina Tzekova

See also
 National titles won by Sicilian teams

References

Bibliography 

EuroLeague Women clubs
Women's basketball teams in Italy
Basketball teams established in 1970
Basketball in Italy